The American Journal of Law & Medicine is a quarterly peer-reviewed academic journal covering health law. It was established in 1975 and is published by SAGE Publications till December 2020, in association with both Boston University School of Law and the American Society of Law, Medicine & Ethics. Starting January 2021, the journal is now published by Cambridge University Press. The editor-in-chief is Edward J. Hutchinson (American Society of Law, Medicine & Ethics).

According to the Journal Citation Reports, the journal has a 2020 impact factor of 1.

References

External links

Medical law journals
Quarterly journals
Boston University School of Law
Academic journals published by universities and colleges of the United States
Publications established in 1975
English-language journals
SAGE Publishing academic journals
American law journals
Peer reviewed law journals